"Aerodynamik" is a song by the German electronic music band Kraftwerk. It was released on 15 March 2004 as the fourth single from their tenth studio album, Tour de France Soundtracks (2003). The song peaked at number-one on the UK dance singles chart.

Track listings

CD

12"

Charts

Weekly charts

AeroDynamik / La Forme Remixes 

"AeroDynamik / La Forme Remixes" (also known as: "AeroDynamik + La Forme Remixes") is a remix single recorded by Kraftwerk and British band Hot Chip. The single was released on 17 September 2007 and includes remixes of two songs from Kraftwerk's 2003 studio album Tour de France Soundtracks. Both songs were remixed by Hot Chip as extended arrangements. The single debuted at #78 on the UK Singles Chart.

Track listings

Charts

References

External links 
 Kraftwerk - Aerodynamik/La Forme Remixes - YouTube
 Kraftwerk – Aerodynamik + La Forme Remixes - Discogs
 

Kraftwerk songs
2007 singles
2004 singles
Songs written by Ralf Hütter
Songs written by Florian Schneider
Songs written by Fritz Hilpert
Songs written by Henning Schmitz
2003 songs